The Doustioni or Dotchetonne were a tribe of American Indians somewhere in the region around the Gulf of Mexico; they are known only from records of the expedition of the Sieur de la Salle, which identify them as allies, in the late 17th century, of the Kadohadacho tribe. Some writers have placed them in northeastern Texas, but this has never been convincingly proven. John R. Swanton identified them as a Caddoan group hailing from the area around Bayou Dauchite in northwestern Louisiana, but this, too, is unproven. No further record of the tribe survives.

Notes

Caddoan peoples
Native American tribes in Texas
Native American tribes in Louisiana
Extinct languages of North America
Extinct Native American tribes
Native American history of Texas
Native American history of Louisiana